Gabor Szilasi (born 1928) is a Canadian artist known for the humanist vision of his social-documentary photography.

Career
Born in Budapest, Hungary in 1928, Gabor Szilasi first became interested in photography while in medical school in 1948. Largely self-taught, Gabor Szilasi started to photograph in Hungary in 1952 when he purchased his first camera, a Zorkij. In 1956, he documented the Hungarian Revolution of 1956 in Budapest and shortly afterwards fled the country. He emigrated to Canada in 1957, settling in Montreal. From 1959 to 1971, he was photographer at the Office du film du Québec. Sam Tata introduced him to the work of Henri Cartier-Bresson and encouraged his social-documentary photography. In 1966, he was introduced to the work of the American documentary tradition as practiced by Paul Strand and Walker Evans while studying at the Thomas More Institute. He was photography teacher at the Collège du Vieux Montreal (1970–1980) and associate professor (1980–1995) and then adjunct professor at Concordia University. The work he made of communities such as Charlevoix, PQ (1970), Montreal`s art community (1960–1980), or was commissioned to make in Italy, Hungary and Poland (1986, 1987, 1990) or of Hungary to which he returned in 1980, 1994 and 1995 aimed at the modernist photography ideal of precision, luminosity and permanence which increased the beauty and historic value of his prints. He used the camera to take views of urban environments, individual portraits or gallery openings.

After 20 years of photographing in black-and-white, around the mid-70s, Szilasi began to use colour to describe certain cultural and social characteristics. He began photographing interiors, mostly living spaces, in colour and later combined colour with black-and-white to convey portraits and interiors. Around 1982, he began photographing electric signs.

Selected exhibitions
In 1997, the Montreal Museum of Fine Arts organized a travelling retrospective of his work titled Gabor Szilasi: Photographs 1954–1996. Monet's Garden was shown at the Montreal Museum of Fine Arts in 1999. In 2017, Montreal's McCord Museum exhibited a 20-year selection of his unpublished photographs of the art world in Montreal, titled The Art World in Montreal, 1960–1980.

Awards
 Governor General's Awards in Visual and Media Arts, 2010
 Paul-Émile Borduas prize for visual arts, 2010
 Knight's Cross of the Order of Merit of Hungary Award, 2018
 Companion of the arts and letters of Quebec

Collections
His work is included in the collections of the Musée national des beaux-arts du Québec, the Musée d'art contemporain de Montréal, the National Gallery of Canada and many other collections. He is represented by the Stephen Bulger Gallery in Toronto.

Personal life
Szilasi is married to the photographer Doreen Lindsay.

References

Bibliography 

Living people
1934 births
20th-century Canadian photographers
21st-century Canadian photographers
Governor General's Award in Visual and Media Arts winners
Hungarian emigrants to Canada